Wuhan Metro Museum is a transport museum located in Jianghan District, Wuhan, Hubei, China, next to the D1 exit of the Wangjiadun East Station on Line 2, Wuhan Metro. Its main exhibition includes the culture and history of Wuhan Metro, as well as the history of Metro in the world.

History
The museum opened on December 27, 2013, the second one of its type in China after that in Shenyang.

Exhibitions
The museum displays include the following:

The history and culture of Wuhan Metro.
The history and culture of metro systems around the world.
Introduction to different metro systems in the world.
Technology regarding building and operating the Metro.
Virtual driving, virtual operation, emergency escaping in tunnels, and fire drills.

References

Museums established in 2013
2013 establishments in China
Railway museums in China
Museums in Wuhan
Wuhan Metro
History of Wuhan